Monsters: History's Most Evil Men and Women is a non-fiction history book by the British Historian Simon Sebag Montefiore, who also wrote 'Jerusalem: The Biography', 'Young Stalin', and 'Heroes - History's Greatest Men and Women', to which this book is a counter.

The book discusses the lives of many historical figures, infamous for their deeds, ranging from Ivan the Terrible who killed his son, to Pol Pot the brutal dictator who strove to forge a country of only farmers, wiping out almost half of his subjects.

References

(1) https://www.amazon.co.uk/Monsters-Historys-Most-Evil-Women/dp/1847249515/ref=sr_1_7?ie=UTF8&qid=1304851167&sr=8-7
(2) http://www.waterstones.com/waterstonesweb/products/simon+sebag+montefiore/monsters/6626023/
(3) http://www.lep.co.uk/lifestyle/monsters_history_s_most_evil_men_and_women_simon_sebag_montefiore_25_10_08_1_79568

Biographies (books)
2009 non-fiction books